John Dethick (died 1671) was Lord Mayor of London in 1656 during the Protectorate.

Biography
John Dethick was the son of John Dethick of West Newington, Norfolk, and Elizabeth, daughter of Thomas Methwold. He was a member of the Worshipful Company of Mercers, Lord Mayor of London in 1656, and knighted by the Lord Protector Oliver Cromwell on 15 September 1656.  He died in 1671 at his country estate at Tottenham in Middlesex and was buried in the church of St Andrew Undershaft in London.

Family
Dethick married firstly Ann, daughter of Francis Smallpiece of Norwich and widow of Thomas Anguish. He married secondly Martha, daughter of Edmund Travers of London. He married thirdly Anne, daughter of Thomas Jolliff of Leek in Staffordshire.
 He had no surviving children from his first or third marriage, but with his second wife Martha he had three children:
 Benjamin, who married Mary, daughter of John Harrison, a London merchant.
 Elizabeth, who married Sir John Banks.
 Susan, who married Edward Rudge, a London merchant.

Notes

References

 

1671 deaths
17th-century lord mayors of London
Year of birth unknown